The Next Titan is a Nigerian entrepreneurial reality TV show, the foremost in Nigeria and currently in its 9th season. The show has hosted several thousands of young entrepreneurs across the country through its regional auditions. Aside from Season 8 when its auditions were held in six cities, the remaining seasons including Season 9 followed the format of four audition cities.

The Next Titan was created by a Nigerian entrepreneur, Mide Akinlaja and the first season premiered in 2013. Usually, Sixteen to Eighteen contestants are picked after regional auditions and subsequent Bootcamp; and the eighteen contestants would live together for either 10 weeks or 13 weeks in the same house called The Titan House. The contestants are made to perform different business tasks as teams, and at least one contestant is evicted weekly from the losing team.

The Business Reality TV show brings together young aspiring entrepreneurs from all walks of life where they out-compete and battle one another in the hope of winning a cash prize to launch their dream business, or to support existing one. At each episode or weekly, the entrepreneurs are tasked with practical business challenges and the contestants are eliminated one by one until the final week where the winner would receive a cash prize to start his or her business venture. The Grand prize has increased over time from Five Million Naira to the current Twenty Million Naira and with additional Five Million Naira consolation prizes for the runners up.

Past Seasons and Winners

The Process 
Eligible Nigerians (21-40 years old graduates) with inspiring, impactful, and scalable business ideas are invited to participate by sending their entries for auditions. Candidates are chosen from entries, for presentations of their business ideas through auditions, and thereafter shortlisted to the Top 50 nationwide for Boot Camp.

On the evening of the last day of the Boot Camp, 16 or 18 most creative and innovative with best business ideas that will make it to the Titan House are unveiled before the audience/guests during the Premiere/Gala evening of the show, before moving into the Titan House to compete for the main reality show and TV knock-out stages.

The 18 contestants are weekly divided into two groups and are given weekly business tasks that help them awaken their creativity and tenacity. In an interesting twist, a contestant from the losing group gets evicted on weekly basis by the judges in the boardroom.

The Winner would emerge at the audience participating grand finale show and would walk off with a grand prize to start or support his/her business.

The Premiere of The Next Titan 
The Premiere is a gala event to launch new season and to unveil 18 finalists of the season that would make it to the Titan House, and it is an event to celebrate the selection of the Top 18 contestants that would be on Television for 10 to 13 weeks. It is an evening of fun, class and entertainment with quality guests.

The Next Titan has since Season one aired on major national Television channels in Nigeria such as Channels TV, Silverbird TV, AIT, DSTV Africa Magic and others. The Season 9]aired on AIT Network and DSTV Africa Magic.

The Titan House 
After moving into the house, contestants are allowed to perform tasks from sponsors, visits, play games, have fun and overall learn in the process. They also battle out their tasks in the boardroom where they will be scrutinized by the Judges Evictions, crossfires and wins on this Business Reality show goes on for 10 weeks till the Top 5 are selected to defend their businesses at the Grand Finale.

Titan Boardroom / Evicti0n Shows 
This is a weekly boardroom where the contestants defend themselves in front of the board, otherwise known as the judges which are usually three to four business leaders. The show has been able to maintain the same judges for nine years. They are Mr. Kyari Bukar, a top business icon in Nigeria; Mr Chris Parkes, a marketing guru and a Briton based in Nigeria; Mrs Lilian Olubi. CEO, EFG Hermes Nigeria; and Mr Tonye Cole, a billionaire business man who has recently ventured into politics.

The Judges 

 Mr. Kyari Bukar

Chairman, Trans-Sahara Investments Corporation

  Mr. Tonye Cole

Co-Founder Sahara Group

  Mrs. Lilian Olubi

Chief Executive Officer, EFG Hermes Nigeria Limited.

  Mr. Chris Parkes

Chairman, CPMS Africa

The Grand Finale 
This is the final stage of the show where the final four or five contestants would make their final presentations in order to win the grand prize. The grand finale is an audience participating event with guests in attendance. It is an evening event with a lot of entertainment

Season 9 is tagged The Game Changer, and the winner is Eric Anthony, and he walked off with N20 Million while the runners- up are Chioma Ukpabi  who went with N2.5 Million; Praize Ben, N1.5m; and Ola Oladunjoye who went with N1m.

See also 
 American Inventor
 The Big Idea
 The Profit
 Dragon's Den
 Gulder Ultimate Search
 The Apprentice

References 

Nigerian reality television series
Entrepreneurship